Karim Kola (also Romanized as Karīm Kolā; also known as Karīm Kalā) is a village in Bahnemir Rural District, Bahnemir District, Babolsar County, Mazandaran Province, Iran. At the 2006 census, its population was 814, in 202 families.

References 

Populated places in Babolsar County